Thomas Newton Jr. (November 21, 1768August 5, 1847) was an American politician. He was born in Norfolk, Virginia.

Biography
Newton was a member of the Virginia House of Delegates from 1796 to 1799. He served as a Democratic-Republican in the United States House of Representatives from March 4, 1801, to March 9, 1830, losing his seat when George Loyall contested his election.  He regained his seat at the next election and served a final term from March 4, 1831, to March 3, 1833.  In the bitterly contested 1824 presidential election, Newton was the only Virginia representative to support the Adams-Clay coalition.

His son John was a Union general during the Civil War and chief engineer of the US Army in the 1880s.

Electoral history
1823; Newton was re-elected unopposed.
1825; Newton was re-elected unopposed.
1827; Newton was re-elected with 64.28% of the vote, defeating Independent George Loyall.
1829; Newton was re-elected with 50.35% of the vote, but the election was invalidated and Loyall was seated.
1831; Newton was re-elected with 51.01% of the vote, defeating Jacksonian Loyall.

External links
biographic sketch at U.S. Congress

1768 births
1847 deaths
Virginia National Republicans
19th-century American politicians
Democratic-Republican Party members of the United States House of Representatives from Virginia
National Republican Party members of the United States House of Representatives
Politicians from Norfolk, Virginia
Deans of the United States House of Representatives
Members of the United States House of Representatives removed by contest